Smiley is a Spanish romantic comedy television series based on the play of the same name by Guillem Clua which stars Carlos Cuevas and Miki Esparbé. It was released on Netflix on 7 December 2022.

Plot 
Set in Barcelona, the plot revolves around the love story between two guys (bartender Álex and architect Bruno), who meet because of a misdirected voicemail.

Cast

Episode List

Production 
The series is an adaptation of the theatrical play Smiley written by Guillem Clua and which was performed onstage by Albert Triola and Ramon Pujol. Production company Minoria Absoluta pleaded for the series to be fully shot in Catalan, but it was eventually shot in Spanish with the subplot involving Eduardo Lloveras and Ruth Llopis using Catalan and the actors dubbing their own voices in the Catalan dub version. The episodes were directed by David Martín Porras and Marta Pahissa.

Release 
Netflix released the 8-episode series on 7 December 2022.

Accolades 

|-
| align = "center" | 2023 || 34th GLAAD Media Awards || colspan = "2" | Outstanding Spanish-Language Scripted Television Series ||  || align = "center" | 
|}

References

External links 
 
 

2020s LGBT-related comedy television series
2020s romantic comedy television series
2020s Spanish comedy television series
2022 in LGBT history
2022 Spanish television series debuts
Catalan-language television shows
Gay-related television shows
Spanish LGBT-related television shows
Spanish-language Netflix original programming
Spanish-language television shows
Television series based on plays
Television shows set in Barcelona